The 1976 New Zealand bravery awards were announced via a Special Honours List dated 2 September 1976, and recognised one person for an act of bravery earlier that year.

Queen's Commendation for Brave Conduct
 Peter John Joseph Mechen – lately Wellington City Corporation Passenger Transport Department.

References

Bravery
Bravery awards
New Zealand bravery awards